John Edward Cater (17 January 1932 – 21 March 2009) was an English actor.

His television credits include: Danger Man; Z-Cars; The Avengers; The Baron; Doctor Who (in the serial The War Machines); Follyfoot; Softly, Softly; Department S; Up Pompeii!; Dad's Army; The Naked Civil Servant; I, Claudius; Alcock and Gander; The Duchess of Duke Street; Thriller (1975), The Sweeney; Inspector Morse; Bergerac; One Foot in the Grave; Lovejoy; Jeeves and Wooster; Midsomer Murders and Doctors.

His film appearances include: The Abominable Dr. Phibes, Dr. Phibes Rises Again and Captain Kronos – Vampire Hunter.

Filmography

Film

Television

References

External links

Obituary in The Guardian
John Cater (Aveleyman.com)

1932 births
2009 deaths
Deaths from liver cancer
English male film actors
English male television actors
Male actors from London
People from Hendon
Alumni of RADA